William Hoyle (5 November 1831 – 26 February 1886) was a British temperance reformer and vegetarian.

Biography

Hoyle born in Rossendale Valley was the fourth child of poor Methodist parents. He worked in a mill from the age of eight and was fully employed as a mill worker by the age of thirteen. Several years later he was a full operative, supervising several looms. He became a vegetarian at the age of seventeen for economic and hygienic reasons.

Hoyle became a teetotaller in about 1846. He was a cotton manufacturer at Brooksbottom with his father in 1851. He established his own mill at Tottington in 1859 which employed 500 men by 1877.

Hoyle contributed to the statistical literature of the temperance movement. He authored books and pamphlets on the topic. Hoyle was elected a Fellow of the Statistical Society. Hoyle was an executive member and vice-president of the United Kingdom Alliance. He was the treasurer of the British Temperance League. He married his wife Alice in 1859. They had a son and daughter.

Hoyle was secretary of a local vegetarian society at Crawshawbooth in the 1850s. He contributed to the vegetarian Dietetic Reformer. His pamphlet Food: Its Nature and Adaptability: An Argument for Vegetarian Diet was published in 1864. He was a vice-president of the Vegetarian Society.

Hoyle died at Southport in 1886. Frederic Richard Lees edited and published Hoyle's final work, Wealth and Social Progress which includes a biographical essay of Hoyle.

Selected publications

Food: Its Nature and Adaptability: An Argument for Vegetarian Diet (1864)
An Inquiry into the Long-Continued Depression in the Cotton Trade (1869)
Our National Resources and How They Are Wasted (1871)
On the Waste of Wealth (1873)
Crime in England and Wales in the Nineteenth Century (1876)
Wealth and Social Progress in Relation to Thrift, Temperance and Trade (with Frederic Richard Lees, 1887)

References

External links
William Hoyle (Internet Archive)

1831 births
1886 deaths
British vegetarianism activists
English temperance activists
Fellows of the Royal Statistical Society
People associated with the Vegetarian Society